Anna Moroni is an Italian woman known in part for her food shows. She is said to have a "passion for cooking," but, rather than being a professional chef, she was an ex-interpreter for the Australian embassy. She also has a cooking school.

References 

Year of birth missing (living people)
Living people
Italian chefs
Women chefs
Place of birth missing (living people)